KUWF-LP, UHF analog channel 36, was a low-powered Univision-affiliated television station licensed to Wichita Falls, Texas, United States. Founded on October 18, 2000, the station was owned by Drewry Communications.

KUWF was put up for sale by previous owner Equity Media Holdings in 2009 as part of a sell-off of all of the company's stations.  A buyer was not found until October, when Drewry Communications Group, owner of ABC affiliate KSWO-TV (channel 7), announced that it would purchase the station as part of a larger deal.

KUWF, however, would cease operations by the fall of 2010; its license would be cancelled by the FCC on October 6, 2010.

References

UWF-LP
Defunct television stations in the United States
Television channels and stations established in 2000
2000 establishments in Texas
Television channels and stations disestablished in 2010
2010 disestablishments in Texas
UWF-LP